Mina Foley (9 March 1930 – 21 January 2007) was a New Zealand coloratura soprano, who rose to prominence in the 1950s. She was the first of many to study under the acclaimed singing teacher Dame Sister Mary Leo. Other prominent singers who studied with Mary Leo included the internationally renowned soprano Dame Kiri Te Kanawa, soprano Dame Malvina Major, and mezzo-soprano Heather Begg. Foley's voice was dubbed "The voice of the century" by some.

On her 1955 New Zealand tour every concert was sold out. She studied abroad, and performed in Ireland, Italy, England, USA and Australia,  returning to New Zealand in 1960. Foley had a severe  mental breakdown in 1961, forcing her retirement after only one year performing in New Zealand. She spent the next 16 years in Oakley Psychiatric Hospital.  In 1978 she staged a return concert.  However, her return to singing was short-lived, and ill-health continued to plague her until her death in 2007.

Recordings
There are three Mina Foley albums in print on the New Zealand label Ode Records. The Early Years (CDMANU1062) was released in 1991 and is a compilation of some of Foley's earliest recordings from the period 1949-1953. These recordings were made in New Zealand. Included are recordings of Verdi's 'Sempre Libera', Mozart's 'Der Holle Rache' (performed in English), Bellini's 'Casta Diva'and Donizetti's 'O luce di quest'anima'.

Songs For You (CDMANU1529) was released in 1996 and is an eighteen track compilation of classics including 'Ave Maria', 'How Great Thou Art' and 'The Lord's Prayer'.

Mina Foley and Michael Tarawhiti McGifford (CDMANU2061) was released on compact disc for the first time in 2007.  It features a selection of songs for solo voice and duets performed by Foley with Michael Tarawhiti McGifford.

References

Obituary: Mina Foley
Niccol, Mary Leo 1895 - 1989

1930 births
2007 deaths
New Zealand operatic sopranos
20th-century New Zealand women opera singers